Pontypool Rugby Football Club is a Welsh rugby union team based in the town of Pontypool, which plays in the WRU Championship (known as the SWALEC Championship for sponsorship purposes). Since the regionalisation of Welsh rugby in 2003, Pontypool RFC is now a feeder club to the Dragons regional team. Pontypool play their home matches at Pontypool Park. Their traditional home kit is a red, white and black-hooped shirt and socks with white shorts, although they did gradually shift to wearing black shorts post-2003.

Pontypool has a long history within Welsh rugby and is one of the country's most notable clubs, being present at the formation of the Welsh Rugby Union in 1881, but disbanding before the turn of the 19th century. The club reformed in 1901 and produced many notable Wales and British Lions international players, including the Jones brothers in the early 20th century and the famed 'Pontypool Front Row' of Charlie Faulkner, Graham Price and Bobby Windsor in the 1970s. The club's 'Golden Era' is generally accepted as the 1970s and 1980s when, under the coaching of Ray Prosser, the first team won the Welsh Club Championship in 1973 and 1975.

History

Early years 

Originally founded 1868, the club played its first match in October before hosting a game between the new club's members at the "Pound" Field on 12 November. The club later travelled to the Pontymoil Cricket Ground on the 9 January 1869, losing 4–1 to the Panteg Rustics.

In 1871, another Pontypool club was formed, called Pegler's Pontypool. However, the town was too small for two clubs and Pontypool FC and Pegler's Pontypool amalgamated on 15 September 1879. Pontypool FC were one of the six teams that created the South Wales Cup competition for 1877/1878. In March 1881, Pontypool was one of the eleven clubs present at the formation of the Welsh Rugby Union in Neath, but by the end of the century the club had disbanded.

In 1901, the club reformed, launching at a public meeting at the Pontypool Town Hall. The club was derived from a combination of three local clubs, Pontypool Thursdays, Pontypool Saturdays and Pontymoel. Pontypool RFC played their first official match at the Recreation Ground against Cardiff Romilly on 21 September 1901, and by 1904 the club had won the Monmouthshire League. After winning the Monmouthshire League again in 1907 Pontypool was recognised as having 'first-class' status for the 1907/08 season, allowing the club to face more notable opposition.

Pontypool's first international player to be capped directly from the club was Cliff Pritchard, who after playing his first games for Wales as a Newport player, joined Pontypool in 1905 and was capped as part of the 1906 Home Nations Championship. Closely following Pritchard were the Jones brothers, David (known as 'Ponty' Jones), Jack and 'Tuan'. All three were capped for the Wales team, representing their country over the period 1907–1921. As well as representing Wales, Jack and 'Tuan' both played for the British Isles team, making them the first British Lions to be selected from Pontypool. In season 1913/14 Pontypool became the unofficial Welsh Club Champions for the first time.

During the early 1920s, Pontypool was one of several major Welsh clubs to suffer from the emergence of professional rugby in England. The club's second Welsh Club Championship came in 1920/21. In the 1921–22 season Pontypool RFC began with only seven players available to them on their roster as players moved to clubs that paid a wage to play. Pontypool RFC continued to struggle through the 1920s, even though their success on the field was impressive. In 1927 Pontypool were victorious against the Waratahs and the Maoris but were two thousand pounds in debt, and the WRU's refusal to allow them a fixture against the South African national team caused local resentment. However Pontypool won back-to-back Welsh Club Championships in seasons 1931/32 and then 1932/33.

In December 1947, a combined Pontypool, Talywain and Blaenavon side played against the Australian national team at Pontypool Park as part of a post-war rebuilding tour. The game ended 0–0. In 1958/59 season the club won the Western Mail's Unofficial Welsh Club Championship. Before the end of the century Pontypool won the Championship another six times in 1972/73, 1974/75, 1983/84, 1984/85, 1985/86 and in 1987/88 with a win percentage of 97.2%.

Golden era 

The great days of Pontypool RFC were in the 1970s and 1980s, when Ray Prosser was coach for eighteen years from 1969. An away match at Pontypool was a daunting experience for even the strongest sides during this period. Their best ever season was probably 1987–88, when they won 35 matches out of 36, scoring 1011 points and conceding only 411 points.

The club's strength during its glory days was its forwards, particularly the legendary Pontypool Front Row celebrated in song by Max Boyce. The Pontypool Front Row also known as the "Viet Gwent", (motto "We may go down; we may go up; but we never go back") was made up of Graham Price, Bobby Windsor and Charlie Faulkner and played as a unit 19 times for Wales, only finishing on the losing side four times. They also played as a unit for the British and Irish Lions in several midweek matches, though never in a British Lions test match.

Professional era 

Pontypool were relegated from the Welsh Division 1 at the end of the 1995 season. In the 1997/98 season, they avoided relegation to Division 2 with a final-day 14–8 win over UWIC.

In February 2002, whilst still playing in Division 1, Pontypool defeated Swansea RFC, the then reigning Welsh/Scottish Champions, 16–14 in a pulsating Principality Cup clash at Pontypool Park. They went on to lose narrowly to Ebbw Vale RFC (22-27) in the quarter final.
 
In May 2002, Pontypool and Aberavon RFC finished at the top of Division 1 on the same number of league points and the same number of tries but the Wizards took the title on a better for/against points ratio. Aberavon then faced a two-legged play-off with Caerphilly, who had been relegated from the Premier Division. Aberavon lost the play-off (66-27 on aggregate) and remained in Division 1 for the 2002/3 season. The controversial play-off system was scrapped after this season. 

In November 2002, Pontypool secured a plumb fixture with the touring Fiji national team at Pontypool Park.  As the club was attempting to mount a serious title challenge, an under-strength Pontypool team was fielded. Pontypool did well in the first half, going into half time only 9 points adrift (13-22).  The second half saw the 5,000 strong crowd witness some superb Fijian play and the tourists ran out easy winners by 74-16
 
In May 2003, the same scenario as the previous season occurred with both Pontypool and Aberavon locked in a two horse race for the title. Due to the clubs' original January fixture being rearranged, the league title would be decided in a winner-takes-all clash at the Talbot Athletic Ground on 13 May 2003. Pontypool defeated Aberavon 40-12 (outscoring the Wizards 5 tries to nil) and were crowned Welsh National League Division One Champions for season 2002–2003.  

On 2 May 2003, Lenny Woodard scored a club record 7 tries in a 90–3 win against Treorchy RFC. His three tries against Aberavon in the 13 May game took his tally for the season to 44 (39 league tries and five in the Principality Cup) and earned him the accolade of having Pontypool's best try aggregate since the First World War, surpassing the 39 by David Bishop in 1983–84, but still falling behind the 55 obtained by wing Tom Robbins in 1913–14.

Pontypool were promoted to the Premier Division in 2003. However, due to the restructuring of Welsh rugby, this league would become secondary to the new Celtic League. Pontypool became a feeder club for the Newport Gwent Dragons regional team.

In May 2006 Pontypool finished bottom of the Premier Division and were relegated to Division One East
 
In the 2007/08 season Pontypool beat Beddau, the then Division One Champions, at Pontypool Park by 53-9 and were declared champions of Division One East and gained promotion to the Premiership Division unopposed as WRU Division One West champions, Tonmawr RFC, failed to achieve criteria laid out by the Welsh Rugby Union to allow membership of the Premier Division. Therefore, Tonmawr were not invited to contest the single promotion place against Pontypool RFC in a play off game.

Since 2012 
It was announced in September 2011 that the Premier Division would be reduced to 10 teams for the 2012–13 season. The teams for the league would be decided on three factors. Firstly, the holding of an 'A Licence' based on stadium criteria. The signing of a 'Participation Agreement' and judged on league results over the previous six seasons.

It was announced that four clubs, Pontypool, Tonmawr, Bridgend and Carmarthen had not achieved the required criteria to be included into the new league. However, pressure from Ospreys and Scarlets backers led to the league being extended to 12 teams with Bridgend and Carmarthen included. Tonmawr, citing financial reasons, opted not to take part in the new league at all and re-entered themselves into Division Six.

Pontypool launched a legal challenge to avoid being the only team relegated but lost the case despite the judge commenting that the WRU's changing of the structure was "against the rules" but that the WRU had the power to do so. Pontypool was guaranteed to be safeguarded from relegation in the first season in the Championship regardless of their final position.

Pontypool started the 2012/13 season poorly, losing all but one of their first twenty matches. However, their fortunes improved towards the end of the season, winning six of their last seven games. Pontypool ended the season in 12th place, above the two relegation places.

Current squad

Notable former players 
The players named below are all internationally capped players who have played for Pontypool.

Club honours
 1903–04; 1906–07 Monmouthshire League Champions
 1913–14; 1920–21; 1931–32; 1958–59; 1972–73; 1974–75; 1983–84; 1984–85; 1985–86; 1987–88 Welsh Unofficial Club Champions.(10 times)
 1982–83 Welsh cup - Winners
 1990–91 WRU Challenge Cup Runners-Up
 2001–02 Welsh National League Division 1 - Runners-Up
 2002–03 Welsh National League Division 1 - Champions
 2007–08 WRU Division One East - Champions
 2016–17; 2017–18; 2018-19 WRU National Championship - Champions

Games played against international opposition

References

External links
Pontypool RFC
Welsh Rugby Union

Welsh rugby union teams
Rugby clubs established in 1901
Pontypool